Yankeeburg is an unincorporated community in Washington County, in the U.S. state of Ohio.

History
A post office called Yankeeburgh was established in 1886, the name was changed to Yankeeburg in 1891, and the post office closed in 1902 Besides the post office, Yankeeburg had its own schoolhouse.

References

Unincorporated communities in Washington County, Ohio
Unincorporated communities in Ohio